BHP Shipping was an Australian ship transport and shipbuilding arm of BHP.

BHP Shipping traces its origins to 1915 when BHP chartered the SS Emerald Wings to transport its first load of iron ore from Whyalla to Newcastle on 19 January 1915. In 1917, shipping agent William Scott Fell & Co arranged for BHP to purchase a share in the steamer SS Koolonga. BHP purchased the ship outright on 30 July 1918 and it was renamed SS Iron Monarch. The BHP Shipping Department was formed on that date, headed up by  who had previously assisted in the shipping arrangements for the 1909 Nimrod Expedition and served on the Advisory Committee to the 1917 Ross Sea Party rescue. Captain William Halley, former master of the Emerald Wings, became Marine Superintendent of the Shipping Department. BHP Shipping was established as a subsidiary shipping line for the parent company in 1921.

As early as 1923 the company considered building its own ships but instead decided to manufacture steel hull plates, a major customer being the Commonwealth Shipping Line. However, in 1939 the company accepted a government request to establish a shipbuilding facility at Whyalla. By 1940 the BHP Whyalla Shipyard had five slipways capable of building ships up to 15,000GT. The first ship constructed at the shipyard was HMAS Whyalla. Between 1941 and 1978, the shipyard produced 63 vessels, of which 15 were built as BHP property. BHP shipping also chartered additional vessels constructed in Whyalla.

Following World War 2, BHP Shipping acquired more bulk carries to carry iron ore, coal and steel products. The ships increased in size up to the 1980s when demand for steel began to decline. From that time some of the ships were used to carry coal, coke and iron ore to export customers.

In December 1983, BHP Shipping was absorbed into BHP Transport Ltd.

BHP Shipping transferred wharves and shore operations to each refinery site ahead of the demerger of BlueScope in 2002. BlueScope also inherited several of the ships.

The remaining fleet is part of BHP Transport and Logistics Pty Ltd, a wholly owned subsidiary of BHP.

Fleet summary

References

BHP
Shipping companies of Australia
Ships of BHP Shipping